The ArpQ Holin (ArpQ Holin) Family (TC# 1.E.15) consists of a single holin-like protein 58 amino acyl residues (aas) in length with 2 transmembrane segments (TMSs). This protein is encoded by the arpQ gene in Enterococcus hirae. While annotated as a holin, it is not functionally characterized.

See also 
 Holin
 Lysin
 Transporter Classification Database

References

Further reading 
 
 

Protein families
Membrane proteins
Transmembrane proteins
Transmembrane transporters
Transport proteins
Integral membrane proteins
Holins